Filmworks XIV: Hiding and Seeking features a score for film by John Zorn. The album was released on Zorn's own label, Tzadik Records, in 2003 and contains music that Zorn wrote and recorded for, Hiding and Seeking (2003), a documentary directed by Menachem Daum and Oren Rudavsky.

Reception
The Allmusic review by Thom Jurek awarded the album 4½ stars noting that "Zorn's score is one of his most beautiful and accessible... This work is beyond folk forms, beyond jazz, and beyond the kitschy sense of humor Zorn often employs (even more so than The Gift), resulting in a work that is profound, moving, and full of sensual delight".

Track listing
 "Merkabah" (vocal)                         -                   6:23
 "Sekhel"                                   -                   4:38
 "Zhakor" (vocal)                           -                   3:43
 "Muflah"                                   -                   5:19
 "Abulafia"                                 -                   2:27
 "Abulafia" (vocal)                         -                   3:39
 "Chirik"                                   -                   4:26
 "Moadim"                                   -                   3:26
 "Zhakor"                                   -                   4:24
 "Sekhel" (vocal)                          -                   4:59
 "Adamah"                                  -                   4:27
 "Merkabah"                                -                   5:31

All music by John Zorn
Recorded at Frank Booth, Brooklyn (New York) in April 2003.
Produced by John Zorn.

Personnel
Marc Ribot – guitar
Kenny Wollesen – vibraphone
Trevor Dunn – bass
Cyro Baptista – percussion
Ganda Suthivarakom (1, 3, 6, 10): vocals.

References

Tzadik Records soundtracks
Albums produced by John Zorn
John Zorn soundtracks
2003 soundtrack albums
Film scores